Marty Quinn is the current alderman of the 13th ward in Chicago. His ward offices are in the Balzekas Museum of Lithuanian Culture. He was elected in 2011, and has been reelected in 2015 and 2019.

References

Chicago City Council members
Living people
Year of birth missing (living people)
21st-century American politicians